Brock Gully is a valley one nautical mile (2 km) south of Windwhistle Peak in the Allan Hills of Victoria Land, Antarctica. It was reconnoitered by the New Zealand Antarctic Research Program Allan Hills Expedition (1964) who named it after the dialect name for a badger because of the resemblance to badger country in parts of England.

See also 
Todd Gully

References 

Valleys of Oates Land